Phytoecia imperialis is a species of beetle in the family Cerambycidae. It was described by Sama and Rejzek in 2001. It is known from Iran.

References

Phytoecia
Beetles described in 2001